The Portrait of the Dancer Anita Berber is a painting executed by German painter Otto Dix in 1925. The painting was done with oil and tempera on plywood. It has the dimensions of 120 by 65 cm. It represents the dancer Anita Berber, a celebrity of Weimar Republic, known for her scandalous performances and licentious lyfestyle, and its at the collection of the Sammlung Landesbank Baden-Württemberg in loan to the Kunstmuseum Stuttgart, Germany.

Description
Dix knew Berber personally, having attended several of her live performances. Although Berber posed for this portrait in the nude, the artist Otto Dix decided to depict her on a red background, wearing a long red dress. The dress covers almost her entire body. She looks to her left, while striking a vamp-like pose, with the right hand in front of her and her left hand resting on her hip. Her hair is red too, while she wears a very thick white makeup, which gives her face a mask-like appearance. Her image emphasizes her sexuality and her status as a sexual icon of her time.

The painting was part of the two stamps edition by Deutsche Post to commemorate the centennial of the birth of Otto Dix  in 1991.

References

1925 paintings
Paintings by Otto Dix
Portraits of women